It Was in May is a 1970 Soviet drama film directed by Marlen Khutsiev that depicts first weeks after the war had ended.

Cast 
 Aleksandr Arzhilovsky as Lieutenant Nikolayev
 Pyotr Todorovsky as Vladimir Yakovenko
 Sergey Shakurov as Margoslin
 Viktor Uralsky as Golub
 Eugenija Pleškytė as Gerta
 Vladimir Gostyukhin as Nyrkov
 Igor Klass as Avdey

References

External links 

1970 drama films
1970 films
Soviet drama films
Studio Ekran films
Soviet black-and-white films
Eastern Front of World War II films
Soviet television films
Films directed by Marlen Khutsiev
1970 television films